Sheykh Azimlu (also Romanized as Sheykh ‘Az̧īmlū, Sheik Azimloo, and Sheykh ‘Azīmlū; also known as  Sheykh ‘Az̧īmū) is a village in Arshaq-e Shomali Rural District, Arshaq District, Meshgin Shahr County, Ardabil Province, Iran. At the 2006 census, its population was 328, in 59 families.

References 

Towns and villages in Meshgin Shahr County